Harun Kamil, SH., is a lawyer, law expert, notary and politician Indonesia. He believed the Constitution served as Chairman of the Forum, which was founded by several prominent members of the legal and political scene in Indonesia. Declaration of the forum in July 2005 and was attended by former Assembly Speaker Amien Rais and Hidayat Nur Wahid, former Chairman of the Constitutional Court Jimly Asshiddiqie, and legal practitioners Todung Mulya Lubis. Previously, Aaron Kamin was a member of the People's Consultative Assembly group representatives.

External links 
Rujukan Tafsir Babon Book GATRA Printed Edition, 2010, November 25. Access on 2013, April 26.
Declared Constitutional Forum TEMPO Interactive, 01 JULY 2005, Accessed 26 April 2013.
Justice Department Will Ask Seven Candidates for President of the Constitutional Court  TEMPO Interactive, 12 AUGUST 2003, Accessed 26 April 2013.

Living people
People from Cirebon
Politicians from West Java
Indonesian Muslims
University of Indonesia alumni
Academic staff of the University of Indonesia
Year of birth missing (living people)